Little Day is the 23rd studio album by Hong Kong singer Joey Yung, released by Emperor Entertainment Group on August 15, 2013.

Track listing

Credits and personnel 

 Executive Producers: Ng Yu / Mani Fok
 Marketing & Media Planning: Douglas Chang
 Artiste Promotion: Purple Ho / Wong Chi Wai / Maggie Tse / Cecilia Hung / Nick Choi
 Artiste Management: Mani Fok / Oscar Cheung / Matthew Lo / Sandy Wai
 A & R: Leo Chan / Leong Shek Chi / Liu Chi Wah / Gordan Tsui
 Digital Entertainment Department: Methy Chi / Bonnie Lee / O Leung / Hesta Cheung / Nancy Tang
 Creative Direction: AllRightsReserved Ltd.
 Design: MavisChan@AllRightsReserved Ltd.
 Proofread: John@AllRightsReserved Ltd.
 Photography: Chen Man
 Styling: Sean K
 Hair Stylist: Heibie Mok@Hair Culture
 Make-up Artist: Arris Law
 Mastered By: Tom Coyne@Sterling Sound, NYC
 Sequenced and PMCD by: Ylam@Zoo Music Studio
 Special Thanks: Broadway Electronic, Itacho Sushi, t.qq.com, WeChat

Release history

References

Joey Yung albums
2013 albums